Don Bosco Institute of Technology (DBIT) is a college located in Kumbalagodu Village, Bangalore. DBIT provides civil, mechanical, engineering technology, computer and management education.

See also
 Don Bosco College of Engineering

References

Engineering colleges in Bangalore
Educational institutions established in 2001
2001 establishments in Karnataka